

Introduction 
Munitions Safety Information Analysis Center, also referred to as MSIAC, is a NATO project funded directly by its member nations, not all of which are NATO members. There are currently 16 member nations: Australia, Belgium, Canada, Finland, France, Germany, Italy, Netherlands, Norway, Spain, Sweden, United Kingdom, United States, Poland, Republic of Korea and Switzerland

History

Pilot-Nato Insensitive Munition Information Center (Pilot-NIMIC) 
On May 26, 1988 the NATO nations France, Netherlands, Norway, United Kingdom and the United States based on a Memorandum of Understanding decided to create Pilot-NIMIC (NIMIC = NATO Insensitive Munitions Information Center). The organization was intended to assist national and international programs to develop insensitive munitions (IM). The idea for NIMIC was born at the NATO AC/310 "Workshop on Insensitive Munitions Information Exchange" in 1986 and was actively supported by the Chairman of AC/310, IGA M. Thévenin and Principal US Member of AC/310, Dr. R. Derr. The founding of this organization was promoted by former NATO Group AC/310 (Safety and Suitability for Service of Munitions and Explosives) in an effort to support munitions developers located in NATO countries. The PILOT-NIMIC office was located at Applied Physics Laboratory (APL) of Johns Hopkins University, Laurel, Maryland, USA. The initial team comprised a project manager and five technical specialists  - basically the same structure MSIAC shows today (see below).  Soon after its foundation Canada joined the project in late 1989.

NIMIC Move to Brussels and Growth 
After its first successful two years of operation the project moved to NATO Headquarters Brussels and officially became NIMIC on May 1, 1991.  Spain and Australia entered the project in 1994, Portugal and Italy became members in 1995. In 1998 Portugal decided to leave NIMIC. Denmark entered the project 1999 but left soon after in 2004.

Merger of AC/258 and AC/310 and Transition to MSIAC 
In May 2003 the Conference of National Armament Directors (CNAD) Ammunition Safety Group (AC/326) (CASG) was formed by a merger of former AC/258 Group of Experts on the Safety Aspects of Transportation and Storage of Military Ammunition and Explosives and the former AC/310 Group of Safety and Suitability for Service of Munitions and Explosives.  With a given broader emphasis on Munitions Safety it was decided to modify NIMIC's scope to take this change into account. Hence its transition to Munitions Safety Information Analysis Center (MSIAC) began with the Pilot MSIAC phase in Spring 2003. The successful transition was accomplished by late 2004 and MSIAC was officially operational on December 15, 2004. Germany finally entered the project in 2005. Belgium entered MSIAC in 2015, Poland - in 2017 and Republic of Korea - in 2018.

Organization 
The MSIAC Project Office consists of a steering committee, National Focal Point Officers (NFPO) and an Information Analysis Center (MSIAC). The steering committee is made up of one voting representative from each member nation and an elected chairman. It is responsible for implementing the Memorandum of Understanding (MOU) that established MSIAC and for developing its policy. This policy is carried out on a day-to-day basis by the MSIAC Project Manager.

Tasks 
The NATO Munitions Safety Information Analysis Center (MSIAC) (Centre d'information et d'analyse sur la sécurité des munitions de l'OTAN (CIASM) in French) provides technical consultancy services to its member nations in the area of munitions safety.
Areas with which MSIAC is concerned include:
 Energetic materials - high explosives, gun propellants, rocket propellants and pyrotechnics;
 Warhead Technology – design, production, testing, terminal effects, fuzing systems;
 Propulsion Technology – design, production, testing, ignition/initiation systems;
 Munitions Systems – weapon system integration, threat and hazard analysis, safety and suitability for service, demil and disposal;
 Munitions Logistics – safety principles and regulations for transport and storage, hazard classification and risk analysis;
 Material Sciences - understanding structural materials and their influence on safety and functionality of ammunition.

Within these areas, MSIAC performs the following functions:

Develop the MSIAC internal database of technical information;
Provide technical advice;
Respond to inquiries from governmental agencies and industry of member nations;
Anticipate inquiries and prepare state-of-the-art reports to deal with them;
Organize technical lectures
Develop and distribute software tools and databases,; 
Organize Round Robin Tests;
Develop and maintain networks of experts, through the sponsorship of workshops and seminars and the creation of e-Working Groups.

List of officials

References 

NATO agencies
Military science
Military technology